The Namco System 357 is an arcade system board based on the Sony PlayStation 3. It was released in 2007 as the board for Tekken 6. Unlike its predecessor, it did not see widespread adoption by other manufacturers. 

In 2011, Namco released an upgraded version of the arcade board, the System 369, also known as System 359, for use with Tekken Tag Tournament 2. The System 369's specifications are the same as Slim model retail PS3 consoles, and as such feature a smaller chassis with less heat.

Specifications
 CPU: Cell Broadband Engine consisting of one 3.2GHz PowerPC-based Power Processing Element (PPE) and six Synergistic Processing Elements (SPEs).
 System memory: 256MB XDR DRAM
 Graphics: NVIDIA GeForce 7800-based RSX 'Reality Synthesizer' with 256MB GDDR3 RAM
 Media: internal HDD used for storage of games.
 UI: Sony XMB

List of System 357 / System 359 / System 369 games
Dark Escape 3D  (2012)
Dark Escape 4D (2014)
Deadstorm Pirates (2010)
Deadstorm Pirates Special Edition (2014)
Dragon Ball ZENKAI Battle Royale (2011)
Dragon Ball ZENKAI Battle Royale - Super Saiyan Awakening (2012)
Mobile Suit Gundam: Extreme Vs. (2010)
Mobile Suit Gundam: Extreme Vs. Full Boost (2012)
Mobile Suit Gundam: Extreme Vs. Maxi Boost (2014)
Razing Storm (2009)
Taiko no Tatsujin (2011)
Taiko no Tatsujin (C/N: KATSU-DON) (2012)
Taiko no Tatsujin Sorairo ver. (2013)
Taiko no Tatsujin Momoiro ver. (2013)
Taiko no Tatsujin Kimidori ver. (2014)
Taiko no Tatsujin Murasaki ver. (2015)
Taiko no Tatsujin White ver. (2015)
Taiko no Tatsujin Red ver. (2016)
Taiko no Tatsujin Yellow ver. (2017)
Taiko no Tatsujin Blue ver. (2018)
Taiko no Tatsujin Green ver. (2019)
Tekken 6 (2007)
Tekken 6: Bloodline Rebellion (2008)
Tekken Tag Tournament 2 (2011)
Tekken Tag Tournament 2 Unlimited (2012)

References

Cell BE architecture
Namco arcade system boards
PowerPC-based video game consoles